Edward James is a Welsh professional footballer who plays as a defender for  club Tiverton, on loan from  club Exeter City.

Career
James made his senior debut for Exeter City on 4 October 2022, in a 2–1 win over Southampton U21 at St James Park in the group stages of the EFL Trophy. James appeared in his inaugural EFL fixture on the 15 October 2022 as a substitute in a 2-4 defeat to Oxford United. On 30 October 2022, he joined National League South side Weymouth on a work experience loan until December 2022. He subsequently joined Tiverton Town in January 2023 on a further work experience loan.

Career statistics

References

Living people
Welsh footballers
Association football defenders
Exeter City F.C. players
Weymouth F.C. players
English Football League players
National League (English football) players
Year of birth missing (living people)